Winslow Reef is the name of two different submerged coral reefs in the central Pacific Ocean. The name may refer to:

Winslow Reef, Cook Islands
Winslow Reef, Phoenix Islands